The fifth season of the Malayalam-language version of Indian reality television series Bigg Boss is produced by Endemol Shine India and Banijay and will broadcast on Asianet along with a 24x7 deferred stream on Disney+ Hotstar OTT platform. The season will be hosted by Mohanlal for the fifth consecutive year and Will Launch on 26 March 2023.

A Commoner from the general public will be selected as a contestant for the first time by the title sponsor Airtel.

Production

Eye Logo 
The Season 5 logo includes eyes with a golde texture with a camera lens, shutter, iris and the pupil as a shiny black gem surrounded by 16 red King's Shield-style rubies. The number 5 is also included on the rim of the eyeball, denoting the fifth season.

Release 
A promo featuring only the logo was released on 15 February 2023. On 23 February 2023, a promo inviting commoners for audition by Airtel was released.

Reference

External links
 

2023 Indian television seasons
Asianet (TV channel) original programming
Malayalam-language television shows